Du Jingchen (born 1952) is a retired vice-admiral (zhong jiang) of the People's Liberation Army Navy (PLAN) of China. He served as Deputy Commander and Chief of Staff of the PLAN, and commander of the East Sea Fleet.

Biography
Du Jingchen was born in 1952 in Tancheng County, Shandong Province. He graduated from Dalian Naval Academy.

Du was deputy chief of staff of the Lüshun Naval Base from 2002 to 2003, and participated in the search-and-rescue mission after the China Northern Airlines Flight 6136 crash in the Bohai Bay. He then served as assistant chief of staff of the PLAN from 2003 to 2007, and chief of staff of the PLAN South Sea Fleet from 2007 to 2009. In December 2008, he commanded China's first anti-piracy naval mission to Somalia.

In December 2009, he was promoted to commander of the East Sea Fleet and concurrently deputy commander of the Nanjing Military Region, a sharp rise from a deputy corps-level post in less than two years. He became chief of staff of the PLAN a year later. In August 2014 he was made deputy commander of the PLAN, replacing Ding Yiping, who had reached the mandatory retirement age.

Du attained the rank of rear admiral in July 2005 and vice-admiral in 2011.

References

1952 births
Living people
People's Liberation Army generals from Shandong
Chiefs of Staff of the People's Liberation Army Navy
People from Linyi
Dalian Naval Academy alumni
Commanders of the East Sea Fleet